Port Sunlight River Park is a river park on the shore of the river Mersey at Port Sunlight, Merseyside, England.

History
The park was formerly a landfill site at Bromborough Dock that was turned into a nature park during a £2.3 million conversion. Now known as Port Sunlight River Park, it opened in summer 2014. The park provides visitors with a number of distinct experiences including a freshwater lake which is rich in wildlife, new habitats, a scenic waterfront, a perimeter walk, a link to Shorefields Nature Park, and paths to the summit with views of the River Mersey estuary and Liverpool skyline.

Facilities
The park has footpaths for use by walkers, joggers and ramblers. The park is 37m above the river level allowing unrivalled views of Liverpool.

Conservation
The park is intended to provide a natural habitat for wildlife, plants and birds.

Power station
Gas from the landfill is extracted via a series of pipes and taken to a nearby power plant and converted to electricity.

References

Parks and commons in the Metropolitan Borough of Wirral